The 2010 North Alabama Lions football team represented the University of North Alabama in the 2010 NCAA Division II football season.

Schedule

References

North Alabama
North Alabama Lions football seasons
North Alabama Lions football